Arthur Bunting (13 June 1936 – 7 June 2017) was an English professional rugby league footballer who played in the 1950s and 1960s, and coached in the 1960s, 1970s and 1980s.

Playing career
Arthur Bunting's birth was registered in Hemsworth district, Wakefield, West Riding of Yorkshire, England, he grew up in a hot bed of rugby league in the Featherstone/Pontefract area, he played for Hull Kingston Rovers, and went on to coach them.

Eastern Division Championship Final appearances
Arthur Bunting played  in Hull Kingston Rovers' 13–10 victory over Huddersfield in the Eastern Division Championship Final during the 1962–63 season at Headingley Rugby Stadium, Leeds on Saturday 10 November 1962.

Challenge Cup Final appearances
Arthur Bunting played  in Hull Kingston Rovers' 5-13 defeat by Widnes in the 1963–64 Challenge Cup Final during the 1963–64 season at Wembley Stadium, London on Saturday 9 May 1964, in front of a crowd of 84,488.

Coaching career
In December 1978, he was offered the chance to coach Hull F.C. Under Bunting, Hull won all the game's major trophies and repeatedly featured in finals, as well as creating a world record, when in winning the Second Division title in 1978–79 they won all of their 26 league games, an achievement never done before or since, he was coach of Hull until 1985.

Challenge Cup Final appearances
Arthur Bunting was the coach in Hull FC's 5-10 defeat by Hull Kingston Rovers in the 1980 Challenge Cup Final during the 1979–80 season at Wembley Stadium, London on Saturday 3 May 1980, in front of a crowd of 95,000, was the coach in the 14-14 draw with Widnes in the 1982 Challenge Cup Final during the 1981–82 season at Wembley Stadium, London on Saturday 1 May 1982, in front of a crowd of 92,147, and in the 18-9 victory over Widnes in the 1982 Challenge Cup Final replay during the 1981–82 season at Elland Road, Leeds on Wednesday 19 May 1982, in front of a crowd of 41,171. and was the coach in the 24-28 defeat by Wigan in the 1985 Challenge Cup Final during the 1984–85 season at Wembley Stadium, London on Saturday 4 May 1985, in front of a crowd of 99,801, in what is regarded as the most marvellous cup final in living memory, which Hull narrowly lost after fighting back from 12-28 down at half-time.

References

External links
Search for "Bunting" at rugbyleagueproject.org
(archived by web.archive.org) Workington and Hull KR triumph in the regions

1936 births
2017 deaths
English rugby league coaches
English rugby league players
Hull F.C. coaches
Hull Kingston Rovers coaches
Hull Kingston Rovers players
People from Hemsworth
Rugby league halfbacks
Rugby league players from Wakefield